Newbattle Abbey was a Cistercian monastery near the village of Newbattle in Midlothian, Scotland, which subsequently become a stately home and then an educational institution.

Monastery
It was founded in 1140 by monks from Melrose Abbey.  The patron was King David I of Scotland (with his son Henry). Its church was dedicated in 1234. The abbey was burned by English royal forces in 1385 and once more in 1544. It became a secular lordship for the last commendator, Mark Kerr (Ker) in 1587.

Newbattle Abbey was a filiation of Melrose Abbey (itself a daughter of Rievaulx Abbey) and was situated, according to Cistercian usages, in a beautiful valley along the River South Esk. Rudolph, its first abbot, a strict and severe observer of the rule, devoted himself energetically to the erection of proper buildings. The church, cruciform in shape, was 240 feet in length, and the other buildings in proportion; at one period the community numbered as many as 80 monks and 70 lay-brothers.

The abbey soon became prosperous and famous for the regularity of its members, several of whom became well-known bishops. It was especially dear to the kings of Scotland, scarcely one of whom failed to visit it from time-to-time, and they were always its generous benefactors.

One of the principal sources of income was the coal mines in its possession, for these monks were among the first, if not the first, coal miners in Scotland. The earliest mention of coal in Scotland is to be found in a charter of an Earl of Winchester, granting to them a coal mine. In 1526 King James V granted them a petition to build a harbour at Morrison's Haven, and it is from this date that Aitchison's Haven Lodge was established as a stonemason's lodge. In 1531, the Abbot of Newbattle agreed with the Abbot of Dunfermline to work his coalmine at Prestongrange so that it would drain water from the neighbouring mines (which belonged to Dunfermline Abbey) to the sea.

Newbattle suffered much from English incursions at various times, particularly in 1385 when the monastery and church were burned, and the religious either carried away or forced to flee to other monasteries; it required 40 years to repair these losses. A part of the monastery was again destroyed by the Earl of Hertford, but the destruction seems to have been chiefly confined to the church.

At the time of the Reformation but few of the monks remained, and these were pensioned by the commendator, Mark Kerr. Kerr made a timely conversion to Protestantism and was able to retain the lands around the abbey. His son, also Mark, became Lord Newbattle in 1596 and Earl of Lothian in 1606.

The monastery site, including burial grounds, traces of the chapel and cloisters and some associated buildings, is now a designated scheduled monument.

Stately home

Part of the abbey was converted into a house which survives at the core of the current building. The house incorporates part of the south end of the monastic range, with the dorter undercroft intact.

The house was modified and rebuilt successively by John Mylne in 1650, William Burn in 1836 and David Bryce in 1858. The drawing room was decorated by Thomas Bonnar around 1870. The 19th century chapel was created in a vaulted undercroft that may date from the original abbey buildings. The chapel includes a 16th-century font and a fine parquet floor, made using wood from the estate, in the style of original tile-work. The library is oak-lined and features a 17th-century moulded ceiling. The garden to the rear of the house includes a pair of large octagonal 17th century sundials. The main abbey remains lie buried to the west and north of the original house.

King George IV visited during his Scottish tour of 1822 and the King's Gate was built in his honour.

College
Newbattle Abbey remained the home of the Marquesses of Lothian until being given to the nation in 1937 by Philip Kerr, 11th Marquess of Lothian, to be used as a College of Education.

The college was established under trustees from the four ancient Scottish Universities specifically for adults returning to education. New residential building was added in the 1960s and funding came through the Scottish Education Department.

In 1987 the Secretary of State for Scotland announced the intention to withdraw funding, threatening the college with closure. However, new forms of financial support have enabled the college to survive.

Burials at the Abbey
Marie de Coucy

See also

 Abbot of Newbattle, for a list of abbots and commendators
 Scheduled monuments in Midlothian

References

 Registrum S. Mariae de Neubotle, Bannatyne Club (1849) Newbattle Abbey charters 1140–1528, & later rentals.
 Cowan, Ian B. & Easson, David E., Medieval Religious Houses: Scotland With an Appendix on the Houses in the Isle of Man, Second Edition, (London, 1976), p. 77

External links
Newbattle Abbey College website

Listed monasteries in Scotland
Cistercian monasteries in Scotland
Christian monasteries established in the 12th century
Religious organizations established in the 1140s
1140 establishments in Scotland
1587 disestablishments in Scotland
Listed houses in Scotland
History of Midlothian
Inventory of Gardens and Designed Landscapes
Category A listed buildings in Midlothian
Country houses in Midlothian
Scottish parliamentary locations and buildings
Scheduled Ancient Monuments in Midlothian
Former Christian monasteries in Scotland
Dalkeith